The Prix Grand-Duc Adolphe (Grand-Duke Adolphe Prize) is a Luxembourgian art award awarded every year to one or more artists exhibiting at the Salon Artistique of the Cercle artistique de Luxembourg (CAL).

The award is named after Grand Duke Adolphe of Luxembourg who created the prize in 1902, on the initiative of his wife Adelheid-Marie of Anhalt-Dessau, who herself was a painter.

Award Recipients

See also

 List of European art awards

References 
  The Cercle Artistique de Luxembourg 
  Prix Grand-duc Adolphe Rules

Luxembourgian art
Visual arts awards
Awards established in 1902
Luxembourgian awards
1902 establishments in Luxembourg